Jim Champion (1913 - 2003) was a rugby league footballer who played in the 1930s for Canterbury-Bankstown in the New South Wales Rugby League competition.

Rugby league career
Champion joined Canterbury in 1938 making his debut against North Sydney.  Champion played in the premiership winning team that season when Canterbury defeated Eastern Suburbs in the final to claim the club's first premiership.  

The following season, Champion was part of the 1939 City Cup winning side scoring twice in the final.  After two years at Canterbury, Champion moved back to Lithgow and played in the local competition.  Champion died in June 2003.

References

1913 births
2003 deaths
Australian rugby league players
Canterbury-Bankstown Bulldogs players
Rugby league centres
Rugby league players from Lithgow, New South Wales